DAMAC Residenze, formerly named DAMAC Heights and Ocean Heights 2, is an 84-storey, supertall skyscraper in Dubai Marina, Dubai. It is the second supertall project by DAMAC Properties, the first being Ocean Heights, which is also located in Dubai Marina. The building overlooks the Palm Jumeirah. 

As of 2022, DAMAC Residenze is the 13th-tallest building in Dubai and the 12th-tallest residential building in the world.

Architecture and design 
Damac Residenze is located in the upper part of the marina, the most populated district of Dubai Marina containing nine skyscrapers and about 10 between 200m and 300m. The design incorporates elements that increase the field of view, giving the impression of a larger space between the DAMAC and the other towers. According to the architects Aedas, the curvature of the tower is crucial to provide views for the largest number of apartments possible.

In February 2013, the foundation work of DAMAC Residenze was in progress, while the piling had already been completed.

The building was topped out in September 2016.

See also
DAMAC Properties
List of tallest buildings in Dubai
List of tallest residential buildings

References

External links
 DAMAC Properties Official website
 Emporis.com
 Property In Dubai

Residential skyscrapers in Dubai
Architecture in Dubai
High-tech architecture
Postmodern architecture